James Anthony Sharkey (born 1945, Derry, Northern Ireland) is an Irish historian and former diplomat.

He was born and educated in Derry and worked as a teacher in Stepney, Derry and Dublin.

Sharkey holds degrees in Russian and Russian history from University College Dublin and Birmingham University. He is the author of works about folk history in Inishowen, Scots Gaelic, the  Russian peasantry and Lafcadio Hearn.

In 1970 he joined the Irish diplomatic service. He served as Irish ambassador to a number of countries. The following list may be incomplete
 1987–1989 Ambassador to Australia
 1989-1995 Ambassador to Japan
 1997–2001 Ambassador to Denmark with concurrent accreditation to Iceland and Norway
 2001–2003 Ambassador to Russia with concurrent accreditation to Armenia, Belarus, Georgia, Kazakhstan, Kyrghyzstan, Tajikistan, and Uzbekistan
 2007–2009 Ambassador to Switzerland with concurrent accreditation to Liechtenstein and Algeria

As Permanent Representative to the Council of Europe, Strasbourg, he chaired the Human Rights Committee and defended the leading role of the European Court of Human Rights.

References

1945 births
Living people
Writers from Derry (city)
People educated at St Columb's College
Ambassadors of Ireland to Algeria
Ambassadors of Ireland to Armenia
Ambassadors of Ireland to Australia
Ambassadors of Ireland to Belarus
Ambassadors of Ireland to Denmark
Ambassadors of Ireland to Georgia (country)
Ambassadors of Ireland to Iceland
Ambassadors of Ireland to Japan
Ambassadors of Ireland to Kazakhstan
Ambassadors of Ireland to Kyrgyzstan
Ambassadors of Ireland to Liechtenstein
Ambassadors of Ireland to Norway
Ambassadors of Ireland to Russia
Ambassadors of Ireland to Switzerland
Ambassadors of Ireland to Tajikistan
Ambassadors of Ireland to Uzbekistan
20th-century educators from Northern Ireland